Pseudalidus fulvofasciculatus is a species of beetle in the family Cerambycidae, and the only species in the genus Pseudalidus. It was described by Pic in 1926.

References

Pteropliini
Beetles described in 1926